Kavaklıdere is the oldest and best known winery in Turkey. Founded by the And family, it is located in Ankara and is named after a neighborhood in the city.

Kalecik Karası, Boğazkere, and Öküzgözü are local grapes typically found in Turkish wines. These are often blended with Shiraz and other grapes. Boğazkere and Öküzgözü can balance sweeter wines with their spicyness.

See also
Turkish wine

External links
Kavaklıdere Anatolian Wines
Kavaklıdere Şarapları 

Buildings and structures in Ankara
Tourist attractions in Ankara
Wineries of Turkey
Companies based in Ankara
Food and drink companies established in 1929
Turkish brands
Turkish companies established in 1929